Shaare Torah or Shaarai/Shaarei Torah ( "Gates of Torah") may refer to:

Synagogues
Shaarai Torah Synagogue (Worcester, Massachusetts)

Yeshivas (schools)
 Yeshiva Shaar HaTorah (Queens, New York)
 Yeshiva Shaar HaTorah, also known as Grodno Yeshiva (Grodno, Belarus)
 Yeshiva Shaarei Torah (Rockland County, New York)
 Yeshivat Shaare Torah (Brooklyn, New York)